Closer to You may refer to:
Closer to You (Carried Away album), or the title song
Closer to You (The Coronas album), 2011
Closer to You (J. J. Cale album), 1994
"Closer to You" (Carly Pearce song), 2018
"Closer to You" (Exo-SC song), 2019
"Closer to You", a song by Brandi Carlile from her eponymous album
"Closer to You", a song by Brett Dennen from Hope for the Hopeless
"Closer to You", a song by the  Mighty Lemon Drops from World Without End
"Closer to You", a song by The Wallflowers from Red Letter Days

See also
Cerca de ti (disambiguation)
Close to You (disambiguation)